The Abbé Jean-Paul Bignon, Cong.Orat. (19 September 1662, Paris – 14 March 1743, Île Belle) was a French ecclesiastic, statesman, writer and preacher and librarian to Louis XIV of France. His protégé, Joseph Pitton de Tournefort, named the genus Bignonia (Virginia jasmine) after him in 1694.

Biography

Born in Paris, Bignon was the grandson of the lawyer and statesman, Jérôme Bignon, and, though older, the nephew of the Count Jérôme Phélypeaux. He did his elementary studies at the school of the famed Abbey of Port Royal in Paris, then studied at the Collège d'Harcourt, following which he entered the Oratory of Paris, and did theological studies at the Seminary of Saint Magloire attached to it. In 1691 he completed his studies and was ordained to the priesthood. In 1693 he was made commendatory abbot of Saint-Quentin-en-l'Isle and preacher to King Louis; he was also appointed to succeed to Seat 20 in the French Academy. He was charged by the minister Colbert to head the Bignon Commission, which investigated the feasibility and then began the compilation of a guide to French artistic and industrial processes, published in the following century as the Descriptions of the Arts and Trades.

He organized the bureaux de la librairie and the committee of expert censors in 1699.

Bignon worked with his uncle to prepare a new set of rules for the Academy, allowing for honorary membership, which were signed by the king in January 1699. The new rules, however, were rejected by its members. The rejection shocked him to such a degree that he refused to attend its meetings thereafter.

Bignon was a patron of Antoine Galland, the first European translator of One Thousand and One Nights. He was also the author of Les aventures d'Abdalla, fils d'Hanif (The adventures of Abdalla, son of Hanif), published in 1712–1714, a novel framed as the title character's search for the fountain of youth and composed of "stories of adventure and love" in which "great stress is laid upon the 'horrid,' the grotesque, the fantastic."

His fame as a preacher is exemplified by two completely different panegyrics he gave on the same day, for the feast day of St. Louis IX. He was elected a Fellow of the Royal Society in 1734.

Publications

Bignon also contributed to the  Médailles du règne de Louis le Grand, Sacre de Louis XV. From 1706 to 1714, he presided over the committee of men of letters who edited the Journal des sçavans, which position he took again in 1724, with the Abbé Pierre Desfontaines.

References

External links

 
 WorldCat
 Biography – Bibliothèque nationale de France 

1662 births
1743 deaths
Clergy from Paris
Writers from Paris
17th-century French writers
17th-century French male writers
18th-century French writers
18th-century French male writers
French librarians
17th-century French Roman Catholic priests
18th-century French Roman Catholic priests
French Oratory
Members of the Académie des Inscriptions et Belles-Lettres
Members of the French Academy of Sciences
Fellows of the Royal Society